The 2022 Rugby Europe Women's Championship was the 25th edition of the tournament. The competition was held from 20 to 27 February and was played in a round-robin format. Spain thrashed the Netherlands 69–0 in the first match. Spain won the Championship after defeating Russia 27–0 to retain the title.

Table

Results

Round 1

Round 2

References 

2019
2022 rugby union tournaments for national teams
Championship
2022 in Russian rugby union
2022 in Dutch women's sport
2021–22 in Spanish rugby union
Rugby Europe
Rugby Europe